State Road 61 is a  north–south route that runs through portions of three counties in the southwest part of the U.S. State of Indiana.

Route description
SR 61 begins at State Road 66 east of Newburgh near the Ohio River.  From there it runs north toward Boonville where it is concurrent with State Road 62.  After Boonville SR 61 heads north towards Petersburg, passing through Lynnville where SR 61 has an interchange with Interstate 64.  After I-64, SR 61 heads northeast on its way to Petersburg.  South of Petersburg, SR 61 has an interchange with Interstate 69. In Petersburg SR 61 is concurrent with State Road 56 and meets State Road 57.  After Petersburg SR 61 heads toward Vincennes, passing through Monroe City where SR 61 and State Road 241 are concurrent.  After Monroe City SR 61 heads northwest.  Then SR 61 enters Vincennes, on Wabash Ave., Clair Street, and 6th Street.  The northern terminus of SR 61 is at an interchange with U.S. Route 41, U.S. Route 50, and U.S. Route 150 on the northeast side of Vincennes.

History 
Between 1917 and 1926 SR 61 was an unnumbered road, and the SR 61 number was not given to any route.  This is due to Indiana going from to SR 1 to SR 55.  In 1926 Indiana Signed the route as SR 61.  In Vincennes SR 61 ended at the old Route of US 41 (6th Street).

Major intersections

References

External links

 Indiana Highway Ends - SR 61

061
Transportation in Knox County, Indiana
Transportation in Pike County, Indiana
Transportation in Warrick County, Indiana